Edwin Thomas Hofstetter (August 12, 1918 – March 8, 2006) was a former member of the Ohio House of Representatives.

References

1918 births
2006 deaths
Republican Party members of the Ohio House of Representatives
20th-century American politicians
People from Geauga County, Ohio